Cung Le (born May 25, 1972) is a Vietnamese actor, retired mixed martial artist, Sanshou fighter and kickboxer. He competed as a middleweight in the Ultimate Fighting Championship (UFC), holding a record of 2–2 with the organization. In kickboxing and sanshou, he is a former International Kickboxing Federation Light Heavyweight World Champion, having a professional kickboxing record of 17–0 before moving to mixed martial arts. He defeated Frank Shamrock to become the second Strikeforce Middleweight Champion before vacating the title to further pursue his acting career. Le is perhaps best known in mixed martial arts for competing in Strikeforce, holding a record of 7–1 with the organization before its demise.

Background
Cung Lê was born in Saigon, South Vietnam (now Ho Chi Minh City, Vietnam). In 1975, three days before the Fall of Saigon, Cung Le and his mother Anne left Vietnam by helicopter. Le's father stayed in Vietnam and was caught as a prisoner. After a few months in a refugee camp in the Philippines, Le ended up in San Jose, California, where early discrimination and bullying inspired him to learn martial arts. His mother enrolled him in Tae Kwon Do classes at the age of 10.

Le began Wrestling competitively at age 14. After being inspired to box by Sylvester Stallone´s Rocky, Le graduated and earned All-American honors in Wrestling his junior year at San Jose High School. He went on to wrestle for West Valley College in Saratoga, California, and won the California Junior College State Championship in the 158 lb weight class in 1990 also earning junior college All-American honors. Le also is practiced in a variety of martial arts such as Judo, Karate, Muay Thai, Boxing, Kuntao and Sambo. He began doing in Sanshou (Sanda) around age of 21 because it complimented his Tae Kwon Do and Wrestling background. Le held a professional Kickboxing record of 17–0 and is a three-time world champion in Kickboxing.

Sanshou and kickboxing career
Le is undefeated in his Sanshou/kickboxing career (17–0). He has won three US Open International Martial Arts Championships (1994, 1995, 1996). In 1998 he won the Shidokan tournament championship. He has also won four US National Championships (Orlando, FL, 1994, Dallas, TX, 1995, Baltimore, MD, 1997).  He earned three bronze medals in his amateur Sanshou world competition compiling an overall amateur record of 18–3.  He has been a three-time captain of the United States teams that competed and was the U.S. team captain at the World Wushu Championships in 1997 (Italy) and 1999 (Hong Kong).  On December 15, 2001 he defeated Shonie Carter by unanimous decision in San Jose, California, to win the IKF International Kickboxing Federation Pro Light Heavyweight Sanda World Title. In May 2003, Le entered into K-1 competitions where he garnered a 3–0 career record, including one knockout.

Mixed martial arts career

Strikeforce
Le made his mixed martial arts debut at Strikeforce: Shamrock vs. Gracie on March 10, 2006, at the HP Pavilion at San Jose, knocking out kickboxing rival Mike Altman at 3:51 of the first round. Le first met Altman in San Jose, in 1999, in a kickboxing bout where he defeated Altman via a body shot in the third round. Three months later he faced KOTC veteran Brian Warren, knocking him out  at 4:19 of the first round. Le had also faced Warren in a K-1 Sanshou bout where he won by decision. At Strikeforce: Triple Threat on December 8, 2006, Le defeated UFC veteran Jason Von Flue in 0:43 of round one, when the fight had to be stopped due to a cut from a kick. Le went on to fight Tony Fryklund.  Le beat Fryklund via TKO due to strikes late in the third round. Soon after Le fought Sammy Morgan at Strikeforce: Four Men Enter, One Man Survives where he won the bout via TKO.

On March 29, 2008 at Strikeforce: Shamrock vs. Le, Le defeated long time MMA veteran Frank Shamrock in a fight co-promoted by Strikeforce and EliteXC at the HP Pavilion in San Jose. Le won via TKO when Frank Shamrock's right arm (ulna) was broken after a series of kicks, making him the new Strikeforce Middleweight Champion. On September 17, 2009, Strikeforce CEO Scott Coker announced that Le had relinquished his belt after securing a major motion picture deal.

Twenty-one months after his last fight, Le returned to Strikeforce to face Scott Smith at Strikeforce: Evolution on December 19, 2009. Le suffered his first MMA defeat there, losing via TKO at 3:25 of the third round. After the match, Le expressed interest in an immediate rematch with Smith. His wish was granted on June 26, Strikeforce: Fedor vs. Werdum, in which Le defeated Smith via TKO in the second round to avenge his only MMA loss at the time.

Ultimate Fighting Championship
Le has said that it is basically the UFC or bust for him at this point in his fighting career. “I know for a fact that if I do fight again, it’s going to be in the UFC. I’ve never fought in the UFC, but I would love to fight in the UFC. But right now because of my contract with Showtime and Strikeforce, hopefully things can work out because there is a show in San Jose that Cain Velasquez is the main event. I would love to fight in San Jose for the UFC ....” In an interview with BloodyElbow on October 27, 2012, Le revealed he originally signed a six-fight contract with the UFC.

Le was briefly linked to a matchup with Vitor Belfort on November 19, 2011, at UFC 139. However, Belfort was removed from the bout and replaced by former Pride FC Middleweight Champion Wanderlei Silva. Le managed to confuse Silva with his unorthodox kicks, and landed a spinning backfist that dropped Silva. During the second round, Silva managed to shake Le with huge punches and knees that completely broke Le's nose. Le was stunned, bloodied and fell to the ground, and the fight was stopped by the referee. Afterwards, in the press conference, Dana White commented that it was a good stoppage and that Cung was taken to the hospital.

Le was scheduled to face former UFC Middleweight Champion Rich Franklin on July 7, 2012, at UFC 148. However, due to an injury to headliner Vitor Belfort, Franklin instead faced Wanderlei Silva in a 190 lb catchweight rematch on June 23, 2012 at UFC 147. Le instead faced former title contender Patrick Côté. He earned his first UFC win via unanimous decision (30-27, 30-27, 30-27).

Le faced Rich Franklin in the main event on November 10, 2012, at UFC: Macao.  Cung Le won the fight via KO with a powerful hook punch to Franklin's head at 2:17 of the first round.

The Ultimate Fighter: China
In November 2013, it was announced that Le would serve as the chief coach and mentor on The Ultimate Fighter: China, the China-based version of The Ultimate Fighter which began airing in December 2013.

After over a year-and-a-half of being away from competition, Le faced Michael Bisping on August 23, 2014, at UFC Fight Night 48. After an even start, Le was cut around both eyes in the second round, as Bisping began to land the more powerful strikes. Bisping eventually won the one sided fight via TKO in the fourth round. Following the fight, Le tested positive for elevated levels of HGH and was subsequently suspended from competition for nine months. However, after reevaluating the evidence against Le, the UFC increased his suspension to 12 months.  There has been some dispute of the test, as the testing laboratory in question was not WADA-approved, did not do the appropriate HGH test, and destroyed the blood sample before confirmatory tests could be done. Ultimately, on October 21, the UFC reversed their decision and rescinded Le's suspension in light of the aforementioned flaws. On December 3, 2014, Le told the media that he instructed his manager to request Le's release from UFC due to the drug-test dispute.

On December 16, 2014, Le was listed as one of three MMA fighters who filed a class-action lawsuit against Zuffa, LLC., the parent company of the UFC.  The suit alleges that the UFC participated in anti-competitive practices that hindered fighters and their mixed martial arts careers. At the time Le was the only active fighter on the organization's roster to be involved in the lawsuit.

Retirement from MMA
On January 20, 2015, his manager, Gary Ibarra, announced to the media that Le had retired from MMA. Le's decision came after reconsidering his career with his family. He had previously expressed his lack of desire to fight in the UFC and contemplated retirement following the performance-enhancing drug disputes he had with the promotion in 2014. Le believed that the UFC owed him an apology for accusing him of using drugs when the test results later turned out to be faulty. Le, however, said that his retirement was only in MMA. He talked about the possibility of returning to professional kickboxing competitions, where he was active prior to his MMA debut.

Acting career
Le co-starred in the live-action Tekken film, based upon the popular martial arts fighting game, as Marshall Law, released November 5, 2009 for the American film market. Le had supporting roles in the science fiction film Pandorum with Dennis Quaid and Ben Foster, and Fighting, released in 2009 alongside Channing Tatum. He also starred in a Hong Kong martial arts film Bodyguards and Assassins, which was released on December 18, 2009; his film was the first time he worked with and had a fight scene with Hong Kong martial arts superstar Donnie Yen.

He also appeared in a Vietnamese music show Paris By Night 99 – Tôi Là Người Việt Nam where he was interviewed by Nguyen Cao Ky Duyen; this show also marked one of the few times Le has spoken Vietnamese on camera.

Le had a lead role in the 2012 action film Dragon Eyes, costarring Jean-Claude Van Damme and produced by Joel Silver. The movie is based on the Akira Kurosawa classic Yojimbo and is "MMA-themed". Also in 2012, Le played Bronze Lion in The Man with the Iron Fists, a film directed by RZA.

In 2014, he starred in Puncture Wounds, an action film directed by Giorgio Serafini, co-directed and written by James Coyne.

In 2015, he appeared as an abbot in the AMC TV series Into the Badlands.

In 2017, he appeared in the action movie Savage Dog alongside martial artists and action stars Scott Adkins and Marko Zaror.

Film and television credits

Fighting style
Cung Le was primarily a stand-up fighter known for his highly unorthodox striking. Drawing from his backgrounds in Wushu, Sanshou, Taekwondo, Wrestling, and Jiu-Jitsu. He had a particularly dangerous kicking game. He was perhaps best known for his use of the spinning back kick and spinning backfist, which he used to win multiple fights by knockout.

Personal life

Le has two sons with his ex-wife. He is married to a Native American bikini model Sunshine Spring Le. 

He often honors Vietnamese communities with the flag of South Vietnam in his fighting uniforms to remember his Vietnamese heritage.

He is fluent in both English and Vietnamese.

Championships and accomplishments

Kickboxing
 International Kickboxing Federation
 IKF Sanshou World Light Heavyweight Championship (one time)
 International Sport Karate Association
 ISKA Sanshou North American Light Heavyweight Sanshou Championship (one time)
 ISKA Sanshou U.S. Light Heavyweight Championship (one time)
 ISKA Sanshou U.S. Light Cruiserweight Championship (one time)
 Ho Tet Tae Kwon Do
 Ho Tet Tae Kwon Do Tournament 1994 Grand Champion
 USA International World Championships
 1996 Continuous Sparring Tae Kwon Do World Champion
 World Wide Draka Federation
 1998 Draka Tournament winner
 Shidokan Cup Bare-Knuckle Full Contact Karate
 1998 Shidokan Cup U.S. Tournament winner
 International Wushu Federation
 1999 WUF World Wushu Championships Sanshou bronze medalist
 1997 WUF World Wushu Championships Sanshou bronze medalist
 1995 WUF World Wushu Championships Sanshou bronze medalist
 Black Belt Magazine
 2007 Kung Fu Artist of the Year

Submission grappling
 Amateur Athletic Union
 AAU Espoir Sambo National Championship (1989)

Mixed martial arts
 Strikeforce
 Strikeforce Middleweight Championship (one time)
 Tied most finishes in Strikeforce (7)
 Most knockouts in Strikeforce (7)
 Ultimate Fighting Championship
 Fight of the Night (one time)
 Knockout of the Night (one time)
 MMAFighting.com
 2012 Knockout of the Year vs. Rich Franklin on November 10
 Inside MMA
 2008 Fight of the Year Bazzie Award vs. Frank Shamrock on March 29

Amateur wrestling
 California Community College Athletic Association
 CCCAA State Championship (1990)
 CCCAA All-State (1990)
 West Valley College wrestling team captain (1990, 1991)
 California Interscholastic Federation
 CIF All-State (1989)
 Amateur Athletic Union
 AAU Espoir Freestyle National Championship (1989)
 AAU Espoir Greco-Roman National Championship (1989)

Mixed martial arts record

|-
| Loss
| align=center| 9–3
| Michael Bisping
| TKO (knee and punches)
| UFC Fight Night: Bisping vs. Le
| 
| align=center| 4
| align=center| 0:57
| Macau, SAR, China
|
|-
| Win
| align=center| 9–2
| Rich Franklin
| KO (punch)
| UFC on Fuel TV: Franklin vs. Le
| 
| align=center| 1
| align=center| 2:17
| Macau, SAR, China
| 
|-
| Win
| align=center| 8–2
| Patrick Côté
| Decision (unanimous)
| UFC 148
| 
| align=center| 3
| align=center| 5:00
| Las Vegas, Nevada, United States
|
|-
| Loss
| align=center| 7–2
| Wanderlei Silva
| TKO (knees and punches)
| UFC 139
| 
| align=center| 2
| align=center| 4:49
| San Jose, California, United States
| 
|-
| Win
| align=center| 7–1
| Scott Smith
| TKO (spinning back kick and punches)
| Strikeforce: Fedor vs. Werdum
| 
| align=center| 2
| align=center| 1:46
| San Jose, California, United States
|
|-
| Loss
| align=center| 6–1
| Scott Smith
| KO/TKO (punches)
| Strikeforce: Evolution
| 
| align=center| 3
| align=center| 3:25
| San Jose, California, United States
|
|-
| Win
| align=center| 6–0
| Frank Shamrock
| TKO (broken arm)
| Strikeforce: Shamrock vs. Le
| 
| align=center| 3
| align=center| 5:00
| San Jose, California, United States
| 
|-
| Win
| align=center| 5–0
| Sammy Morgan
| TKO (body kick)
| Strikeforce: Four Men Enter, One Man Survives
| 
| align=center| 3
| align=center| 1:58
| San Jose, California, United States
|
|-
| Win
| align=center| 4–0
| Tony Fryklund
| TKO (body kick and punches)
| Strikeforce: Shamrock vs. Baroni
| 
| align=center| 3
| align=center| 0:25
| San Jose, California, United States
|
|-
| Win
| align=center| 3–0
| Jason Von Flue
| TKO (doctor stoppage)
| Strikeforce: Triple Threat
| 
| align=center| 1
| align=center| 0:43
| San Jose, California, United States
|
|-
| Win
| align=center| 2–0
| Brian Warren
| KO (punches)
| Strikeforce: Revenge
| 
| align=center| 1
| align=center| 4:19
| San Jose, California, United States
|
|-
| Win
| align=center| 1–0
| Mike Altman
| KO (punch)
| Strikeforce: Shamrock vs. Gracie
| 
| align=center| 1
| align=center| 3:51
| San Jose, California, United States
|

Kickboxing/Sanshou record

|- bgcolor=""
|
| Win
|Brian Ebersole
|Strikeforce
|San Jose, California
|Decision (unanimous)
| 5
| N/A
| 17–0
|
|- bgcolor=""
|
| Win
|Brian Warren
|K-1 World Grand Prix 2004 in Las Vegas I
|Las Vegas, Nevada
|Decision (unanimous)
| 4
| 2:00
| 16–0
|
|- bgcolor=""
|
| Win
|Phil Petit
|K-1 World Grand Prix 2003 in Las Vegas II
|Las Vegas, Nevada
|Decision (unanimous)
| 4
| 2:00
| 15–0
|
|- bgcolor=""
|
| Win
| Scott Sheely
|K-1 World Grand Prix 2003 in Las Vegas
|Las Vegas, Nevada
|TKO (strikes)
| 2
| 1:13
| 14–0
|
|- bgcolor=""
|
| Win
|Shonie Carter
|Strikeforce
|San Jose, California
|Decision (unanimous)
| 5
| N/A
| 13–0
|
|- bgcolor=""
|
| Win
|Jeff Thornhill
|Strikeforce
|San Jose, California
|KO (spinning back fist)
| 3
| N/A
| 12–0
|
|- bgcolor=""
|
| Win
| Laimon M. Keita
|K-1 USA Championships 2000
|Las Vegas, Nevada
|Decision (unanimous)
| 5
| 3:00
| 11–0
|
|- bgcolor=""
|
| Win
| Mike Altman
|Strikeforce
|San Jose, California
|KO (double roundhouse kick)
| 3
| 0:30
| 10–0
|
|- bgcolor=""
|
| Win
| Na Shun Gerile
|Art of War: China vs. USA
|Honolulu, Hawaii
|TKO (scissor kick)
| 3
| N/A
| 9–0
|
|- bgcolor=""
|
| Win
| Scott Sheely
|Strikeforce
|San Jose, California
|TKO (broken cheek bone)
| 2
| 0:59
| 8–0
|
|- bgcolor=""
|
| Win
| Dan Garett
|Strikeforce
|San Jose, California
|KO (body kick)
| 3
| 0:20
| 7–0
|
|- bgcolor=""
|
| Win
| Arne Soldwedel
|1998 Shidokan Cup
|Chicago, Illinois
|KO (right hook)
| 7
| N/A
| 6–0
|
|- bgcolor=""
|
| Win
| Laimon M. Keita
|1998 Shidokan Cup
|Chicago, Illinois
|Submission (foot lock)
| 2
| N/A
| 5–0
|
|- bgcolor=""
|
| Win
| Ben Harris
|1998 Shidokan Cup
|Chicago, Illinois
|KO (spinning hook kick)
| 2
| N/A
| 4–0
|
|- bgcolor=""
|
| Win
| Minaru Taro
|Draka V
|Los Angeles, California
|KO (head kick)
| 1
| N/A
| 3–0
|
|-
|- bgcolor=""
|
| Win
| Gaik Isrelyan
|Draka V
|Los Angeles, California
|Decision (unanimous)
| 5
| N/A
| 2–0
|
|- bgcolor=""
|
| Win
| Jason Yee
|1997 Kung Fu Championships
|Orlando, Florida
|Decision (unanimous)
| 5
| N/A
| 1–0
|
|-
| colspan=10 | Legend:

See also
 List of current UFC fighters

References

External links 

 
 IKF San Shou
 
 
 
 Profile at K-1
 ConvictedArtist.com Interview with Cung Le

1972 births
21st-century American male actors
21st-century Vietnamese male actors
American male film actors
American male kickboxers
American male mixed martial artists
American male taekwondo practitioners
American male sport wrestlers
American male television actors
American Muay Thai practitioners
American practitioners of Brazilian jiu-jitsu
American sambo practitioners
American sanshou practitioners
American sportspeople in doping cases
American sportspeople of Vietnamese descent
Cruiserweight kickboxers
Doping cases in mixed martial arts
Kickboxers from California
Light heavyweight kickboxers
Living people
Male actors of Vietnamese descent
Middleweight mixed martial artists
Mixed martial artists from California
Mixed martial artists utilizing Muay Thai
Mixed martial artists utilizing taekwondo
Mixed martial artists utilizing sanshou
Mixed martial artists utilizing sambo
Mixed martial artists utilizing collegiate wrestling
Mixed martial artists utilizing Brazilian jiu-jitsu
People from Ho Chi Minh City
Sportspeople from San Jose, California
Sportspeople from Ho Chi Minh City
Strikeforce (mixed martial arts) champions
Ultimate Fighting Championship male fighters
Vietnamese emigrants to the United States
Vietnamese male film actors
Vietnamese male mixed martial artists
Vietnamese male taekwondo practitioners
Vietnamese male sport wrestlers
Amateur wrestlers
Vietnamese male television actors
Vietnamese Muay Thai practitioners
Vietnamese practitioners of Brazilian jiu-jitsu
West Valley College alumni